The 1970 New Zealand gallantry awards were announced via a Special Honours List dated 5 May 1970, and recognised one New Zealander for gallantry during operations in Vietnam.

Distinguished Flying Cross (DFC)
 Flying Officer Trevor Keith Butler – Royal New Zealand Air Force; of Auckland.

References

Gallantry awards
New Zealand gallantry awards